Dichomeris fusca is a moth in the family Gelechiidae. It was described by Kyu-Tek Park and Ronald W. Hodges in 1995. It is found in Taiwan.

The length of the forewings is about 10.5 mm. The forewings are pale yellowish orange with a few brown scales and a greyish-brown fascia along the margin and a well-developed brown spot beneath the cell and another small brown spot at the end of the cell, as well as a broad greyish-brown fascia on the termen. The hindwings are rather pale grey.

References

Moths described in 1995
fusca